Kirk Smith may refer to: 

Kirk R. Smith (1947-2020), American climatologist
Kirk Stevan Smith (born 1951), former bishop of the Episcopal Diocese of Arizona 
Kirk W. Smith, United States Air Force officer